Sketchbook is the seventh studio album by American singer Fantasia. Backed by a licensing deal with BMG Rights Management, it was released by her own label, Rock Soul Inc., on October 11, 2019, in the United States. The album debuted and peaked at number 62 on the US Billboard 200. The song "Enough" was released in May 2019 as the album's lead single followed by "PTSD" featuring T-Pain. A music video for the song "Bad Girl" premiered with the album's release. Sketchbook was promoted by appearances at the 2019 BET Awards, Sunday Best, The Real, as well as a North American tour supported by Robin Thicke, Tank, and singer The Bonfyre in the fall of 2019. The latter two would appear on a remix of "PTSD" released digitally and serviced to United States urban contemporary radio in November of the same year.

Critical reception

Andy Kellman from Allmusic rated the album three out of five stars. He found that "contrary to the title, nothing sounds incomplete or even off-the-cuff. It's more like a lookbook. Skittering percussion and other mechanical, trap-styled production touches are most common [...] It merely hints at what Fantasia might be able to do if she took a truly sketchbook-like approach in the studio. There's no telling what she'd cook up in a couple weeks of live recording with a small band fluent in funk and rock." Associated Press journalist Melanie J. Sims felt that Fantasia "is staying true to her artistry on Sketchbook, her first independent release. She delivers the fullness of her voice on the sexy, guitar-laced "Believer" and the easygoing "Enough"; pours her honeyed vocals over the island-influenced beat of "Take Off"; and experiments with a rock feel on "Warning" [...] thankfully Fantasia makes Sketchbook a work of art."

Commercial performance
Sketchbook debuted at number 62 on the US Billboard 200 and number 33 on the Top R&B/Hip-Hop Albums with 10,000 album equivalent units. This marked her lowest first week placement as well as her first studio album of original material to debut outside of the top 20 of the Billboard 200.

Track listing
Track listing adapted from the iTunes Store.

Charts

References

2019 albums
Fantasia Barrino albums